Nyam may refer to:

 New York Academy of Medicine, a scholarly institution for medical research in New York City
 Nyam language, an Afro-Asiatic language

People with the name
 Enkhsaikhany Nyam-Ochir
 Nyam-Osoryn Tuyaa
 Nyam-Osor Naranbold
 Sainjargalyn Nyam-Ochir

See also 
 Nyam Nyam (disambiguation)
 Nyame, the God of the Akan people of Ghana
 Nyame (name)